These are the Official Charts Company's UK Dance Albums Chart number ones of 2020. The chart week runs from Friday to Thursday with the chart-date given as the following Thursday.

Chart history

See also

 List of UK Albums Chart number ones of 2020
 List of UK Dance Singles Chart number ones of 2020
 List of UK Album Downloads Chart number ones of 2020
 List of UK Independent Albums Chart number ones of 2020
 List of UK R&B Albums Chart number ones of 2020
 List of UK Rock & Metal Albums Chart number ones of 2020
 List of UK Compilation Chart number ones of the 2020s

References

External links
Dance Albums Chart at the Official Charts Company
UK Top 40 Dance Albums Chart at BBC Radio 1

2020 in British music
United Kingdom Dance Albums
2020